Solemn Novena was a gothic rock band from Belfast, Northern Ireland.

History
Solemn Novena formed in early 2006 in Belfast, Northern Ireland. The band's line-up consisted of members Louise Crane on vocals, Marc McCourt on guitar/ vocals, and Stuart Harland on guitar. The band's main aim was to bring the musical genre of gothic rock into the 21st century using haunting keyboards and vocals, 12-string guitars with much reverb and loud, pounding bass guitar. Their sound is quite similar to that of other gothic rock bands such as Rosetta Stone and The Mission.

The band's five-track EP As Darkness Falls was released on 20 December 2006 at a release party @ Necrodanse (Lavery's, Belfast)

Solemn Novena featured as 'Best Unsigned Band' in Gothic Magazine (March 2007) and appeared on journalist Mick Mercer's list of 'Top 30 Goth Singles'.

The band's first album, Kiss The Girls, was released on 28 May 2010, through the Dark Dimensions/Alice In... label group.

Due to various reasons the band split up at the beginning of July 2010. Marc McCourt has since formed a new band, Snakedance, whose EP Winterland was released in 2011.

Members
Louise Crane - Vocals
Marc McCourt - Guitar / Vocals
Stuart Harland - Guitar / Bass

Discography
As Darkness Falls EP - 2006
"Silver" (Digital Single) - 2009
Kiss The Girls - CD - 2010

See also
Gothic rock
List of Gothic rock bands

References

External links
Solemn Novena official website

Musical groups from Belfast
Rock music groups from Northern Ireland